The 1972–73 Cleveland Cavaliers season was the third season of NBA basketball in Cleveland, Ohio. The Cavaliers finished the season with a 32–50 record, finishing last in the Central Division and 6th Eastern Conference. This was the 2nd consecutive year with a total win increase. Lenny Wilkens led the team in assists and was named an All-Star.

Offseason

Trades
August 23: Guard Lenny Wilkens and forward Barry Clemens obtained from the Seattle SuperSonics in exchange for guard Butch Beard.

September 21: Cavaliers trade the rights to 1971 second-round draft choice Steve Hawes to the Houston Rockets in exchange for a future undisclosed draft choice.

Draft picks

 Note: This table only lists players drafted through the second round.

Roster

Regular season

Season standings

Record vs. opponents

Game log

Awards and records
 Dwight Davis, NBA All-Rookie Team 1st Team

References

 Cleveland Cavaliers on Database Basketball
 Cleveland Cavaliers on Basketball Reference

Cleveland
Cleveland Cavaliers seasons
Cleveland
Cleveland